Deh-e Sheykh Dilgun (also Romanized as Deh Sheykh-e Dīlgūn; also known as Deh-e Sheykh and Deh Sheykh-e Delīgān) is a village in Sepidar Rural District, in the Central District of Boyer-Ahmad County, Kohgiluyeh and Boyer-Ahmad Province, Iran. At the 2006 census, its population was 96, in 14 families.

References 

Populated places in Boyer-Ahmad County